Ou Khatta is a sweet and sour chutney or marmalade made of ou (elephant apple; Dillenia indica) in jaggery, in the Indian state of Odisha, mostly in post-monsoon season. Sometimes ou is added to dal or dalma. It is rich in vitamin C.

History
According to popular Odia legends ou plant was only found in Paradise. Goddess Parvati brought it to earth along with the betel vine.

Variants and  methods
As it is a sour fruit, it is cooked with jaggery or sugar. People who don't like sugar also prepare it with tangy mustard and garlic paste based gravy, along with red chilli powder.

See also
Dillenia indica
Oriya cuisine

External links
Preparation of the sweet and sour oou khata

Odia cuisine
Oriya cuisine